Charles Barnett (September 23, 1954 – March 16, 1996) was an American comedian and actor.

Life and career
Barnett was born in Bluefield, West Virginia. He first made a name for himself in the late 1970s and early 1980s, performing several shows of raunchy comedy a day at outdoor parks in New York City, most notably in Washington Square Park. In September 1980, Barnett auditioned for Saturday Night Live. Producer Jean Doumanian was ready to hire him; however, Barnett was self-conscious about his poor reading skills and he skipped a follow-up reading. His spot in the cast was ultimately given to Eddie Murphy.

Barnett was reportedly envious and resentful of Murphy for several years, although in 1983 he told Jet magazine, "Now that I'm making it, I watch Saturday Night Live every Saturday."

Barnett went on to appear in film and on television.  In the 1983 comedy film D.C. Cab, he played the role of Tyrone, one of the main characters who begins and ends (after the credits) the movie.  He had a recurring role on the hit 1980s TV series Miami Vice as Neville 'Noogie' Lamont. He appeared on Def Comedy Jam in 1993. Although the episode was not aired on TV, the DVD release of Def Comedy Jam contains an extra DVD with "2 Raw 4 TV", which has a Barnett performance. His last film role was in 1996 in the film They Bite. He died that year at age 41 from complications from AIDS due to intravenous drug use.

Select filmography
They Bite (1996)
Mondo New York (1988)
Nobody's Fool (1986)
Beer (1985)
My Man Adam (1985)
T.J. Hooker (1982-1986)
Miami Vice (1984–1989)
D.C. Cab (1983)

References

External links
 
 

1954 births
1996 deaths
Male actors from West Virginia
AIDS-related deaths in New York (state)
African-American male actors
American male film actors
American male television actors
People from Bluefield, West Virginia
20th-century American male actors
20th-century African-American people